Wen Lirong (born 2 October 1969) is a Chinese former footballer who played as a defender. She competed in the 1996 and 2000 Summer Olympics.

In 1996 she won the silver medal with the Chinese team. She played four matches, but missed the final after being sent off in the semifinal.

Four years later she was a member of the Chinese team which finished fifth in the women's tournament. She played all three matches.

References

External links

profile

1969 births
Living people
Chinese women's footballers
Footballers at the 1996 Summer Olympics
Footballers at the 2000 Summer Olympics
Olympic footballers of China
Olympic silver medalists for China
1995 FIFA Women's World Cup players
Olympic medalists in football
1991 FIFA Women's World Cup players
1999 FIFA Women's World Cup players
Carolina Courage players
San Diego Spirit players
Expatriate women's footballers in Japan
Expatriate women's soccer players in the United States
Chinese expatriate footballers
Chinese expatriate sportspeople in Japan
Chinese expatriate sportspeople in the United States
Iga FC Kunoichi players
Nadeshiko League players
Women's United Soccer Association players
Asian Games medalists in football
Footballers at the 1990 Asian Games
Footballers at the 1994 Asian Games
Footballers at the 1998 Asian Games
Medalists at the 1996 Summer Olympics
China women's international footballers
Asian Games gold medalists for China
Women's association football defenders
Medalists at the 1990 Asian Games
Medalists at the 1994 Asian Games
Medalists at the 1998 Asian Games
FIFA Century Club